Build or Bust is a reality television series.

Premise
The concept for Build or Bust was that host and custom motorcycle builder Russell Mitchell took in a member of the public who thought it would be easy to build a bike "just like the guys on TV." Russell gave the guy (or girl) access to all the tools and parts necessary to make a custom motorcycle, allowing the contestant one month to assemble it. If at the end of that time the contestant built a bike that met Russell's standards, they get to keep it. If they did not, they lost the motorcycle.

Episode guide

Season 1: 2005

Season 1 Episode 1:
Fat Fingers
A short-fused jock attempts to build a bike and inject his own ideas only to discover his head is not as big as his forearms.

Season 1 Episode 2:
The Snake
Sweet-talking, overly confident Chad slithers his way into the shop.

Season 1 Episode 3:
The Sage
Professional blacksmith Joe brings an old world discipline and aesthetic to the art of bike building.

Season 1 Episode 4:
Girls Can Build, Too
Female mechanic Alex is all passion and sass.

Season 1 Episode 5:
Bicycle By Day, Chopper By Night - Part 1
Alan converts bicycles into motor bikes in his spare time; Jesse Rooke joins the crew at Exile Cycles.

Season 1 Episode 6:
Bicycle By Day, Chopper By Night - Part 2
Tensions rise as the guys at Exile Cycles question Jesse Rooke's motives.

Season 1 Episode 7:
The Real Ron
Army vet Ron reminisces over life as he fights a new battle, a costume chopper.

Season 1 Episode 8:
The William Wall Show
Rough rider Bill Wall is pure passion and determination as he sets forth on the ultimate lone journey, building a custom bike from the ground up.

Season 1 Episode 9:
Johnny Comes Marchin' Home
Exile bad boy Johnny returns as a master builder. Young Texan Adam brings a lot of confidence and attitude.

Season 1 Episode 10:
The Accident
Seattle custom woodworker Chris attempts to transfer his knowledge of building with wood to building with metal.

Season 1 Episode 11:
The Diva
Bike enthusiast and TV personality Kerry Casem attempts to build a custom chopper.

Season 2: 2006

Season 2 Episode 1:
The Detroit Designer
JC builds a bike.

Season 2 Episode 2:
Delivery Man by Day, Bike Builder by Night
Robb Harbison builds the bike of his dreams.

Season 2 Episode 3:
The Farmhand
Satya, a hardworking farm worker tries to win a bike in 30 days.

Season 2 Episode 4:
Massachusetts Man
Jason Roche.

Season 2 Episode 5:
Simply 'Mr. Finner'

Season 2 Episode 6:
Canada Represents

Season 2 Episode 7:
So-Cal Rebel
Bike builder Johnathan Smith.

Season 2 Episode 8:
Kick Start John
Hot rod builder John Schiess.

Season 2 Episode 9:
Mini Bike Builder
Justin Taylor.

Season 2 Episode 10:
Jim the Survivor
Jim Silba.

Season 2 Episode 11:
Brian the Engineer
Tragedy threatens the build.

Season 2 Episode 12:
EPISODE: 12
Brian pushes forward in his build though still mourning the passing of his friend.

See also
Biker Build-Off

References

2005 American television series debuts
2006 American television series endings
2000s American reality television series
Motorcycle television series